The Clemson Tigers men's basketball teams of 1912–1919 represented Clemson Agricultural College in college basketball competition.

1911–12

1912–13

1913–14

1914–15

1915–16

1916–17

The team began playing in the newly constructed YMCA Building (today known as Holtzendorff Hall)

1917–18

1918–19

An influenza epidemic on campus cut the season short.

References

Games: 
Coaches & captains: 

1912